The 2018 TCR Thailand Touring Car Championship will be the third season of the TCR Thailand Touring Car Championship. The championship will run within the Thailand Super Series' events.

Teams and drivers 
All teams and drivers were Thai registered

Calendar and results
The 2018 schedule was announced in December 2017. The first three events will support the 2018 TCR Asia Series, which also marks the first time the series has held a round outside of Thailand.

Drivers' championship

References

External links
 

TCR
Thailand Touring Car Championship